This is a list of electoral division results for the Australian 1993 federal election in the state of Tasmania.

Overall results

Results by division

Bass

Braddon

Denison

Franklin

Lyons

See also 

 Members of the Australian House of Representatives, 1993–1996

References 

Tasmania 1993